Dichaeturidae is a family of worms belonging to the order Chaetonotida.

Genera:
 Dichaetura Lauterborn, 1913
 Marinellina Ruttner-Kolisko, 1955

References

Gastrotricha